Alexander Stewart, Duke of Rothesay (16 October 1430 – 16 October 1430) was the eldest of a pair of twins. He died in infancy, and his younger twin brother became James II of Scotland. The twins were born in Holyrood Palace, Edinburgh.

The title Duke of Rothesay is the honour taken by the heir apparent to the Scottish throne, and so it was given to this boy, the fifth child but first son of James I of Scotland and Joan Beaufort.

Ancestry

References

1430 births
1430 deaths
15th-century Scottish people
Scottish royalty
Scottish princes
Alexander
Alexander
Dukes of Rothesay
High Stewards of Scotland
15th-century Scottish peers
Heirs apparent who never acceded
Royalty and nobility who died as children
Sons of kings
Scottish twins